Israel competed at the 2011 World Aquatics Championships in Shanghai, China between July 16 and 31, 2011.

Open water swimming

Men

Swimming

Israel has qualified 7 athletes in swimming.

Synchronised swimming

Israel has qualified 3 athletes in synchronised swimming.

Women

Reserve
Ievgeniia Teltelbaum

References

Aquatics
Nations at the 2011 World Aquatics Championships
2011